Route 171, or Highway 171, may refer to:

Canada
 Prince Edward Island Route 171
 Quebec Route 171

Costa Rica
 National Route 171

Ireland
 R171 road

Israel
 Route 171 (Israel)

Japan
 Japan National Route 171

Korea, South
 Expressway 171
 Osan–Hwaseong Expressway
 Yongin–Seoul Expressway

United States
 U.S. Route 171
 Alabama State Route 171
 Arkansas Highway 171
 California State Route 171 (former)
 Connecticut Route 171
 Florida State Road 171 (former)
 Georgia State Route 171
 Illinois Route 171
 K-171 (Kansas highway)
 Kentucky Route 171
 Maine State Route 171
 Maryland Route 171
 M-171 (Michigan highway)
 Minnesota State Highway 171
 Missouri Route 171
 Nevada State Route 171
 New Hampshire Route 171
 New Jersey Route 171
 New Mexico State Road 171
 New York State Route 171
 North Carolina Highway 171
 Ohio State Route 171
 Oklahoma State Highway 171
 Pennsylvania Route 171
 South Carolina Highway 171
 Tennessee State Route 171
 Texas State Highway 171
Business State Highway 171-E (Texas)
 Texas State Highway Loop 171
 Farm to Market Road 171
 Utah State Route 171
 Virginia State Route 171
 Washington State Route 171
 Wisconsin Highway 171
 Wyoming Highway 171
Territories
 Puerto Rico Highway 171